The Lords Spiritual are the bishops of the Church of England who serve in the House of Lords of the United Kingdom. 26 out of the 42 diocesan bishops and archbishops of the Church of England serve as Lords Spiritual (not counting retired archbishops who sit by right of a peerage). The Church of Scotland, which is Presbyterian, and the Anglican churches in Wales and Northern Ireland, which are no longer established churches, are not represented. The Lords Spiritual are distinct from the Lords Temporal, their secular counterparts who also sit in the House of Lords.

Ranks and titles
The Church of England comprises 42 dioceses, each led by a diocesan bishop. The Archbishops of Canterbury and York, as Primate of All England and Primate of England, respectively, have oversight over their corresponding provinces. The occupants of the five "great sees"—Canterbury, York, London, Durham and Winchester—are always Lords of Parliament.

Of the remaining 35 bishops, the 21 most senior sit in the House of Lords, although the normal operation of this rule was suspended in 2015 (following the decision of the Church to begin to appoint women as bishops), instead meaning that until 2025 every woman appointed as a diocesan bishop will automatically be appointed as a Lord Spiritual when a vacancy next arises, regardless of seniority, so as to balance out the representation of female bishops in the House. Otherwise, seniority is determined by total length of service as an English diocesan bishop (that is to say, it is not lost by translation to another see). The Bishop of Sodor and Man and the Bishop of Gibraltar in Europe may not sit in the House of Lords regardless of seniority as their dioceses lie outside both of England and of the United Kingdom.

Theoretically, the power to elect archbishops and bishops is vested in the diocesan cathedral's college of canons. Practically, however, the choice of the archbishop or bishop is made prior to the election. The Prime Minister chooses from among a set of nominees proposed by the Crown Nominations Commission; the sovereign then instructs the college of canons to elect the nominated individual as a bishop or archbishop.

One of the Lords Spiritual is appointed by the Archbishop of Canterbury to be the convenor of the bench; he or she coordinates the work of the bishops in the House. Alan Smith, Bishop of St Albans, was appointed the current convenor on 23 September 2022.

Status as peers
Even during the early years of the Peerage, the position of bishops was unclear. During the reign of King Richard II, the Archbishop of Canterbury declared, "of right and by the custom of the realm of England it belongeth to the Archbishop of Canterbury for the time being as well as others his suffragans, brethren and fellow Bishops, Abbots and Priors and other prelates whatsoever, — to be present in person in all the King's Parliaments whatsoever as Peers of the Realm". The claim was neither agreed nor disagreed to, however, by Parliament.

The Lords Spiritual at first declared themselves entirely outside the jurisdiction of secular authorities; the question of trial in the House of Lords did not arise. When papal authority was great, the King could do little but admit a lack of jurisdiction over the prelates. Later, however, when the power of the Pope in England was reduced, the Lords Spiritual came under the authority of the secular courts. The jurisdiction of the common courts was clearly established by the time of Henry VIII, who declared himself head of the Church of England in place of the Pope, ending the constitutional power of the Roman Catholic Church in England.

Despite their failure to be tried as temporal peers in the House of Lords, it remained unclear whether the Lords Spiritual were indeed peers. In 1688, the issue arose during the trial of the Seven Bishops—William Sancroft, Archbishop of Canterbury; Sir Jonathan Trelawny, 3rd Baronet, Bishop of Winchester; Thomas Ken, Bishop of Bath and Wells; John Lake, Bishop of Chester; William Lloyd, Bishop of Worcester; Francis Turner, Bishop of Ely and Thomas White, Bishop of Peterborough—by a common jury. The charge was that a petition sent by the Bishops constituted seditious libel; the Bishops argued that they had the right to petition the Sovereign at any time, while the prosecution charged that such a right was only permissible when Parliament was in session (which, at the time of the delivery of the petition, it was not). If the bishops were only Lords of Parliament, and not peers, their right to petition would be vitiated while Parliament was dissolved. Peers, however, were and still are counsellors of the Sovereign whether Parliament is in session or not; therefore, if the bishops were indeed peers, they would be free to send petitions.  Since there was no doubt that the petition was actually sent, while the Court still ruled the bishops not guilty, it appears that it was taken for granted that the bishops were counsellors of the Crown.

Nevertheless, the Standing Orders of the House of Lords provide, "Bishops to whom a writ of summons has been issued are not Peers but are Lords of Parliament."

Number
In the early history of the Parliament of England, the Lords Spiritual—including the abbots—outnumbered the Lords Temporal. Between 1536 and 1540, however, King Henry VIII dissolved the monasteries, thereby removing the seats of the abbots. For the first time and thereafter, Lords Spiritual formed a minority in the House of Lords.

In addition to the 21 older dioceses (including four in Wales), Henry VIII created six new ones, of which five survived (see historical development of Church of England dioceses); the Bishops of the Church of England were excluded in 1642 but regained their seats following the Restoration; from then until the early nineteenth century no new sees were created, and the number of lords spiritual remained at 26.

Bishops, abbots, and priors, of the Church of Scotland traditionally sat in the Parliament of Scotland. Laymen acquired the monasteries in 1560, following the Scottish Reformation, and therefore those sitting as "abbots" and "priors" were all laymen after this time. Bishops of the Church of Scotland continued to sit, regardless of their religious conformity. Roman Catholic clergy were excluded in 1567, but Episcopal bishops continued to sit until they too were excluded in 1638. The bishops regained their seats following the Restoration, but were again excluded in 1689, following the final abolition of diocesan bishops and the permanent establishment of the Church of Scotland as Presbyterian. There are no longer bishops in the Church of Scotland, and that church has never sent any clergy to sit in the House of Lords at Westminster.

Bishops and archbishops of the Church of Ireland were entitled to sit in the Irish House of Lords as Lords Spiritual. They obtained representation in the Westminster House of Lords after the union of Ireland and Great Britain in 1801. Of the Church of Ireland's ecclesiastics, four (one archbishop and three bishops) were to sit at any one time, with the members rotating at the end of every parliamentary session (which normally lasted approximately one year). The Church of Ireland, however, was disestablished in 1871, and thereafter ceased to be represented by Lords Spiritual.

The Bishop of Sodor and Man, although a Bishop of the Church of England, has never been included among the English Lords Spiritual, as the Isle of Man has never been part of the Kingdom of England or of the United Kingdom. The Lord Bishop is the holder of the oldest office in Tynwald (the oldest continuous parliament in the world) and remains an ex officio member of Tynwald Court and of the island's Legislative Council.

In the 19th century, the dioceses of the Church of England began gradually to come under review again. However an increase in the bench of bishops was not considered politically expedient, and so steps were undertaken to prevent it. In 1836, the first new bishopric was founded, that of Ripon; but it was balanced out by the merger of the Bishoprics of Bristol and Gloucester. (They were later divided again.) The creation of the Bishopric of Manchester was also planned but delayed until St Asaph and Bangor could be merged. They never were; but the Bishopric of Manchester Act 1847 went ahead anyway with an alternative means to maintain the 26-bishop limit in the House of Lords: the seniority-based proviso which has been maintained to this day. However, the Lords Spiritual (Women) Act 2015 gives any woman appointed a diocesan bishop in England during the next decade priority in terms of succeeding those among the current 21 who retire during that period. Rachel Treweek became Bishop of Gloucester and the first woman Lord Spiritual under the Act in 2015; Christine Hardman became the second later that year.

In 1920, with the independence of the Church in Wales from the Church of England and its disestablishment, the Welsh bishops stopped being eligible for inclusion.

The 26 seats for the Lords Spiritual are approximately % of the total membership of the House of Lords.

Politics
Although the Lords Spiritual have no party affiliation, they do not sit on the crossbenches, their seats being on the Government side of the Lords Chamber, on the right-hand side of the throne. Though in a full sitting the Bishops occupy almost three rows, the Lords Spiritual's front bench is subtly distinguished by being the only one in the House with a single armrest at either end; it is on the front row, close to the throne end of the chamber, indicating their unique status.

By custom, at least one of the Bishops reads prayers in each legislative day (a role taken by the Chaplain to the Speaker in the Commons). They often speak in debates; in 2004 Rowan Williams, then Archbishop of Canterbury, opened a debate into sentencing legislation. Measures (proposed laws of the Church of England) must be put before the Lords, and the Lords Spiritual have a role in ensuring that this takes place.

Other religious figures as Lords Temporal
Other religious figures have sat in the House of Lords as Lords Temporal in recent times: Chief Rabbi Immanuel Jakobovits was appointed to the House of Lords (by the Queen, who acted on the advice of Prime Minister Margaret Thatcher), as was his successor Chief Rabbi Jonathan Sacks. In recognition of his work at reconciliation and in the peace process in Northern Ireland, Robin Eames, the Church of Ireland (Anglican) Archbishop of Armagh, was appointed to the Lords by John Major. 

Other Christian clergy appointed include the Methodist minister Donald Soper, the Anglican priest Timothy Beaumont, the Free Presbyterian Church of Ulster ministers the Rev. Ian Paisley and the Rev. William McCrea, and, to date, the only Church of Scotland cleric to have been elevated to the upper house, the Very Rev. George MacLeod.

There have been no Roman Catholic clergy appointed since the Reformation, though it was rumoured that Cardinal Basil Hume, the Archbishop of Westminster, and his successor, Cardinal Cormac Murphy O'Connor, were offered peerages by James Callaghan, Margaret Thatcher and Tony Blair respectively, but declined. Hume later accepted the Order of Merit, a personal appointment of the Queen, shortly before his death. O'Connor said he had his maiden speech ready, but ordained Roman Catholics are prohibited by the internal canon law of the Roman Catholic Church from holding major offices connected with any government other than the Holy See.

Former archbishops of Canterbury and of York, who revert to the status of regular bishop, and are no longer diocesans, are customarily offered life peerages, so that they can continue to sit as Lords Temporal.

Reforms

2011 proposed House of Lords reform
Under the House of Lords Reform Bill 2012, proposed by the Coalition Government, the Lords would be either 80% elected and 20% appointed, or 100% elected. In the former case, there would be 12 Church of England bishops in the reformed upper house. The total of 12 bishops would include the five "named Lords Spiritual" (the Archbishops of Canterbury and York and the Bishops of Durham, London and Winchester, entitled as they are to sit ex officio) plus seven other "ordinary Lords Spiritual" (diocesan bishops chosen by the church itself through whatever device it deems appropriate). The reduction from 26 to 12 bishops would be achieved in a stepped fashion: up to 21 bishops would remain for the 2015–2020 period and up to 16 for the 2020–2025 period. The ordinary Lords Spirituals' terms would coincide with each "electoral period" (i.e., the period from one election to the next), with the church able to name up to seven to serve during each electoral period. These reforms were later dropped.

2015 change temporarily giving preference to women
Under the Lords Spiritual (Women) Act 2015 whenever a vacancy arises among the Lords Spiritual during the ten years following the Act coming into force (18 May 2015 – 18 May 2025), the vacancy has to be filled by a woman, if one is eligible. The Act does not apply to the sees of Canterbury, York, London, Durham and Winchester, the holders of which automatically have a seat in the House of Lords. Five women have consequently become Lords Spiritual as a result (one of whom has since retired), as of October 2022. (Additionally, Sarah Mullally entered the Lords ex officio when appointed Bishop of London in 2018.)

Criticism
The presence of the Lords Spiritual in the House of Lords has been criticised, with some media commentators and organisations arguing that the system is outdated and undemocratic. Humanists UK has described it as "unacceptable" that "the UK is the only Western democracy to give religious representatives the automatic right to sit in the legislature". There has also been criticism of the "anomaly of having religious representation from one of the four nations of the United Kingdom but not from the other three"; while the appointment procedures have been described as "secretive and flawed".

Richard Chartres, then Bishop of London, defended the bishops in 2007, saying they are "in touch with a great range of opinions and institutions", and suggesting the inclusion of "leading members in Britain's [other] faith communities".

See also

Christian state
List of Lords Spiritual
Lord Bishop
Reform of the House of Lords

References

Bibliography
 Davies, Michael. (2003) Companion to the Standing Orders and guide to the Proceedings of the House of Lords, 19th ed.
 Owen, Peter. (2007) "Choosing Diocesan Bishops in the Church of England."

External links
 

 
Bishops by type
Religion and politics
Church of England ecclesiastical polity
Religion in the City of Westminster
House of Lords
Constitution of the United Kingdom
Episcopacy in Anglicanism

de:House of Lords#Geistliche Lords